Jacky Ward (born November 18, 1942, Groveton, Texas, United States) is an American country music artist. He is popularly known worldwide for his 1977 hit single "Fools Fall in Love".

Between 1972 and 1982, he released four albums with Mercury Records, and charted more than 15 singles on the Billboard Hot Country Singles (now Hot Country Songs charts. His highest-peaking single, "A Lover's Question", reached number three on the charts in 1978. In Ward's career, he recorded three duets with Reba McEntire, including McEntire's first top-40 country hit, "Three Sheets in the Wind". After leaving Mercury in the early 1980s, Ward briefly signed with Asylum Records, releasing a cover of Ricky Nelson's "Travelin' Man" that year. Although he released four singles for the label, Ward never issued an album on Asylum, and left the country music business in the late 1980s.

In the 1980s, he also hosted a show on The Nashville Network called Dancin' USA.

Jacky Ward left the country music industry in 1985. He has been a minister and teacher of the gospel for over 20 years. He is presently the interim pastor of West Corinth Baptist Church in Corinth, Mississippi.

Discography

Albums

Singles

APeaked at number six on Bubbling Under Hot 100 and number 98 on the RPM Top Singles chart in Canada.

References

1946 births
American country singer-songwriters
Living people
Singer-songwriters from Texas
Mercury Records artists
People from Groveton, Texas
Country musicians from Texas